Speyside can refer to:
 Speyside, Ontario, a settlement in Ontario
 Strathspey, Scotland, the famous whisky producing region by the River Spey
 Speyside single malts, the type of whisky produced in Strathspey
 Speyside, Trinidad and Tobago in Trinidad and Tobago